Gillian "Gill" Deacon (born April 26, 1966, in Toronto, Ontario; name is pronounced "Jill") is a Canadian author and broadcaster, currently the host of Here and Now on CBLA-FM in Toronto. In 2016, she was also the moderator of the national Canada Reads.

Biography 

Before working in radio, Gillian Deacon was a television broadcaster. She hosted the CBC's flagship daytime television show called The Gill Deacon Show on CBC Television in Canada, from 2006 to 2007. Her past TV hosting credits include co-hosting with Jay Ingram from 1996 to 2002 on Discovery Channel Canada's @discovery.ca, as well as CBC Television's Code Green.

Deacon has also worked as a television host for CBC Montreal and CTV. In Montreal, she spent four years hosting and writing for Citybeat, a national half-hour program showcasing Quebec arts and culture. During that time, she was also a weekly arts correspondent for CBC News: Morning on CBC Newsworld.

Deacon is well known for her interest in environmental issues. Her first book, Green for Life (Penguin, 2008), a book of common-sense alternatives and practical solutions for leaving a smaller ecological footprint, was a national bestseller. From 2008 to 2009, she wrote a monthly greening column of the same name for Chatelaine.

Her second book, There's Lead in Your Lipstick: Toxins in Our Everyday Bodycare and How to Avoid Them (Penguin, 2011), was also a national bestseller and an Amazon Top 100 book, and spent several weeks on The Globe and Mail bestseller list. Deacon's books have led her to work actively as a public speaker, providing presentations for companies and organizations looking to broaden their awareness and commitment to sustainability.

Before establishing her career in journalism, she taught elementary school children with learning disabilities, guided bicycle tours in Europe and New Zealand, and was the lead singer for the band Bag of Hammers, with Kevin Fox. She is married to Grant Gordon, who founded Key Gordon Communications Inc., an advertising and design firm that works for only ethical and green products, causes and companies.

References

External links
Gill Deacon

Canadian television journalists
Canadian talk radio hosts
CBC Radio hosts
Living people
Writers from Toronto
Writers from Montreal
1966 births
Anglophone Quebec people
Canadian television talk show hosts
Journalists from Toronto
Journalists from Montreal
Canadian women television journalists
Canadian women radio journalists
Canadian women environmentalists
Canadian women radio hosts